AXN Beyond was a pay television channel, owned by Sony Pictures Entertainment in the Asia-Pacific region. It was launched on 1 January 2008.

Feeds
 Southeast Asian feed - available in Singapore, Hong Kong, Thailand, and Indonesia
 Philippine feed - branched off from the Southeast Asian feed; shared the same schedule as the Malaysian feed.
 Malaysian feed - branched off from the Southeast Asian feed. Only channel to natively broadcast in high-definition.

Programmes

Paranormal and Science Fiction
 Andromeda
 Being Human (U.K.)
 Being Human (U.S.)
 Buffy the Vampire Slayer
 Caprica
 CHAOS
 Combat Hospital
 Dark Angel
 Falling Skies
 Hex
 Jake 2.0
 Journeyman 
 Lost
 Life on Mars
 Masters of Science Fiction
 Moonlight
 Mysterious Ways
 Night Stalker
 Northern Mysteries
 Painkiller Jane
 Pushing Daisies
 Roswell
 Sleepwalkers
 Supernatural
 Teen Wolf
 The 4400
 The Dresden Files
 The X-Files
 True Blood

Drama
 A Gifted Man
 Camelot
 Chuck
 Eli Stone
 Jericho
 Necessary Roughness
 Pan Am
 Reaper
 Sherlock

Comedy
 Better Off Ted

Reality & Documentaries
 Breaking the Magician's Code: Magic's Biggest Secrets Finally Revealed
 Criss Angel: Mindfreak
 David Blaine: Street Magic
 David Blaine: Magic Man
 David Blaine: Vertigo
 David Blaine: Frozen In Time
 David Blaine: Drowned Alive
 David Blaine: What is Magic?
 Destination Truth
 Estate of Panic
 Face Off
 Flipping Out
 Ghost Adventures
 Haunting Evidence
 Keith Barry: Extraordinary
 Keith Barry: The Escape
 Magic Asia India
 Mondo Magic Singapore
 Ripley's Believe It or Not
 Scare Tactics
 Sony Style TV Magazine
 The Duke

Movies, Mini-Series and Specials
 7eventy 5ive
 Alice
 Atomic Twister
 CJ7
 Coma
 Dangerous Waters: Shark Attack
 Deep Rescue
 Darkman
 Dead Birds
 Devour
 Dr. Jekyll and Mr. Hyde (2008)
 Dragonheart
 Exquisite Corpse
 Fallen
 Ghosts of Mars
 Heartland Ghost
 I Still Know What You Did Last Summer
 Idle Hands
 Impact
 Locust: Day of Destruction
 Mary Reilly
 Mercury Rising
 Nature of the Beast
 Omega Doom
 Persons Unknown
 Rose Red
 San Diego Comic-Con 2010
 Scream Awards
 Species
 Species II
 Species III
 Species: The Awakening
 Still Small Voices
 Storm Seekers
 Suck
 The Breed
 The Prisoner
 The Sacred
 Texas Chainsaw Massacre: The Next Generation
 Tornado Valley
 Toxic Skies
 Urban Legend
 Urban Legends: Bloody Mary
 Urban Legends: Final Cut
 Vampires: The Turning
 Werewolves: The Dark Survivors
 Wild Fires
 Wolf Lake

Animation
 Afterworld
 Final Fantasy: The Spirits Within

See also
 BeTV (Asia Pacific)

References

External links
 AXN Asia website
 AXN Beyond at Telebisyon.net

AXN
Sony Pictures Television
Defunct television channels
Science fiction television channels
Television channels and stations established in 2008
Television channels and stations disestablished in 2012